Dünhaupt is a German surname. Notable people with the surname include:

Angelika Dünhaupt (born 1946), German luger
Gerhard Dünnhaupt (born 1927), German bibliographer, literary historian, and professor

German-language surnames